Alexandre Cyr (12 November 1922 – 17 August 2006) was a Liberal party member of the House of Commons of Canada. He was born in Chandler, Quebec and his career included several positions including businessman, executive, accountant, public servant, secretary and secretary-treasurer.

Cyr was first elected at the Gaspé electoral district in the 1963 federal election. He was defeated there in the 1965 election, but regained the seat in the following election in 1968. He was re-elected for successive terms in 1972, 1974, 1979 and 1980.

In the 1984 federal election, Cyr was defeated by Charles-Eugène Marin of the Progressive Conservative party.

External links
 
 

1922 births
2006 deaths
Members of the House of Commons of Canada from Quebec
Liberal Party of Canada MPs